The 7th Arizona Territorial Legislative Assembly was a session of the Arizona Territorial Legislature which convened on January 6, 1873, in Tucson, Arizona Territory.

Background
The Indian Wars continued within Arizona Territory. Dissatisfied with the situation, Governor Anson P.K. Safford and Territorial Delegate to Congress Richard C. McCormick had successfully lobbied for a replacement to General George Stoneman as commander of the District of Arizona.  Replacing the general was Colonel George Crook who was bringing new methodologies to the fight.

Following the establishment of a public school system by the previous legislature, Arizona's first public school had opened in March 1872.  On a more private level, Governor Safford and his wife Jenny had experienced a public falling out of their marriage following the death of their infant son. The situation had escalated to the point where she had printed and distributed pamphlets claiming he had committed marital infidelity and contracted a venereal disease.

Legislative session 
The legislative session began on January 6, 1873.

Governor's address
Governor Safford gave his address to the session on January 17, 1873.  In regards to the Apache situation, he stated "The hostility of Indians strikes at the life of our people, retards immigration, prevents development of our resources, and impoverishes the masses."

In more mundane matters, Safford reported on the need to revise the territorial legal code, build a prison, and make provisions for the care of the insane. He also declared Arizona's "great diamond mine" a hoax.

Legislation
Among the session’s accomplishments was the transfer of a section of Pima County to Maricopa County.  They also changed the name of Arizona City to Yuma.

The legislature authorized Governor Safford to print an immigration pamphlet promoting the territory.  They also passed a resolution to commend General Crook.

Finally the legislature passed granted a divorce to the Governor and his wife.

Members

References

Further reading
 

07
07
1873 in Arizona Territory
Territorial Legislature